Chalk Farm is an area of London.

Chalk Farm may also refer to:

 Chalk Farm Road, a street in the Camden Town area of London
 Chalk Farm Salvation Army Band, a brass band from London
 Chalk FarM (band), an alternative band from Los Angeles
 Chalk Farm tube station, a tube station in London, England